Deborah Mandel Senn (March 8, 1949 – February 18, 2022) was an American lawyer and politician of the Democratic Party. She was the 7th Washington Insurance Commissioner for two terms from 1993 to 2001. In 2000, in lieu of running for re-election, she ran for the U.S. Senate, losing in the Democratic primary election to Maria Cantwell. In 2004, she unsuccessfully ran for Attorney General, narrowly defeating Mark Sidran by less than 10,000 votes in the primary, but losing to Rob McKenna in the general election. Senn also has been partner in a law firm. She is a first cousin, once-removed of current Washington State Representative Tana Senn.

Deborah Senn was raised in Chicago's South Shore neighborhood. Senn served as chief counsel in Illinois Governor James R. Thompson's Office of Consumer Services.

Electoral history

References

Washington (state) Democrats
Washington (state) Insurance Commissioners
Women in Washington (state) politics
Politicians from Chicago
Politicians from Seattle
University of Illinois Urbana-Champaign alumni
Loyola University Chicago School of Law alumni
Jewish American people in Washington (state) politics
1949 births
Living people
21st-century American Jews
21st-century American women